Centro de Deportes Barco is a football team based in O Barco de Valdeorras in the autonomous community of Galicia. Founded in 1973, it plays in the Tercera División RFEF – Group 1. Its stadium is Estadio Municipal de Calabagueiros.

Season to season

18 seasons in Tercera División
1 season in Tercera División RFEF

References

External links
Official website
Futbolme.com profile

Football clubs in Galicia (Spain)
Divisiones Regionales de Fútbol clubs
Association football clubs established in 1973
1973 establishments in Spain